The discography of American alternative rock supergroup A Perfect Circle consists of four studio albums, two compilation albums, one extended play, one video album, thirteen singles, one promotional single and thirteen music videos. A Perfect Circle is the brainchild of Billy Howerdel. After hearing demos of Howerdel's music, Maynard James Keenan, the lead singer of Tool, offered his services as vocalist. Howerdel agreed, and the band formed in 1999. They were then joined by bassist/violinist Paz Lenchantin, guitarist Troy Van Leeuwen, formerly of Failure, and drummer Tim Alexander, formerly of Primus. Soon after entering the studio to record their first album, Alexander was replaced by Josh Freese of The Vandals. Mer de Noms was released in May 2000, selling 188,000 copies its debut week. The band embarked on a number of headlining tours all over the world to promote the album which was certified gold by the Recording Industry Association of America (RIAA) one month after its release, and platinum just four months later.

While preparing for their second album, Lenchantin and Van Leeuwen left the band to pursue other projects. They were replaced by bassist Jeordie White (Marilyn Manson) and guitarist Danny Lohner, both of whom had been involved in the production of Mer de Noms and the later Emotive album. Lohner performed only one track on the album before he was replaced by James Iha, formerly of The Smashing Pumpkins. Thirteenth Step was released in September 2003, selling 231,000 copies its debut week. The band followed the release by touring throughout North America, Europe and Japan for the remainder of the year. In 2004, the band continued touring in Australia, Japan, New Zealand and Europe, concluding in the late-spring in the United States. The album was certified gold just six weeks after release, and platinum in March 2006.

The third album, Emotive, was released in November 2004, selling 142,000 copies its debut week. Two weeks later, the band released the DVD-CD set entitled Amotion. The set contains music videos for all eight singles, previously unreleased videos, and nine remixes. Emotive was certified gold five weeks after its release, and Amotion a month after its release.

Albums

Studio albums

Compilation albums

Video albums

Extended plays

Singles

Promotional singles

Music videos

See also
List of songs recorded by A Perfect Circle

Notes

References

External links
 
 
 

Discography
Heavy metal group discographies
Discographies of American artists